Grins is a municipality in the Landeck district in the Austrian state of Tyrol located 3.7 km west of Landeck and 18 km east of Sankt Anton am Arlberg. The village has 10 subdivisions. Settlement of the area already began 2000 years ago because of the sunny climate but the village was mentioned for the first time in documents in 1288 as „Grindes“.

In 1945 the location was greatly destroyed by a conflagration but could be restored true to the original. Main source of income is summer tourism, but the village becomes a commuter community more and more.

References

External links

Cities and towns in Landeck District